A general election was held in the U.S. state of Illinois on November 8, 2022. The elections for United States Senate and United States House of Representatives, Governor, statewide constitutional officers, Illinois Senate, and Illinois House were held on this date.

Election information
2022 is a midterm election year in the United States.

The primary election was held on June 28. The general election was held on November 8, 2022.

On June 17, 2021 Governor J. B. Pritzker signed a bill which made a number of election-related changes. The bill made the November election day a state holiday. It also made permanent a number of changes that had been implemented for the preceding 2020 elections amid the COVID-19 pandemic, including "curbside voting" and universal access to postal voting. The bill also delayed the date of the 2022 primary election from March 15 to June 28, citing the delay in the release of 2020 United States Census data needed for the reapportionment of electoral districts.

Federal elections

United States Senate

The incumbent Senator of Illinois's class 3 United States Senate seat is first-term Democrat Tammy Duckworth, first elected in 2016

United States House of Representatives

All of Illinois's seats in the United States House of Representatives were for election in 2022. Prior to these elections, Illinois will see its congressional seat boundaries change due to redistricting and will lose one seat due to post-2020 United States Census reapportionment.

State elections

Governor and Lieutenant Governor

The incumbent Governor and Lieutenant Governor, J. B. Pritzker and Juliana Stratton won reelection.

Attorney General

Incumbent Attorney General, Democrat Kwame Raoul, won reelection.

Secretary of State

The incumbent Secretary of State is sixth-term Democrat Jesse White. He has announced that he will not seek reelection to a seventh term. Alexi Giannoulias defeated Dan Brady in the Secretary of State election.

Comptroller

The incumbent Comptroller is Susana Mendoza, a Democrat who was first elected in a 2016 special election and subsequently reelected in 2018.

Democratic primary

Candidates

Nominee
Susana Mendoza, incumbent comptroller

Endorsements

Results

Republican primary

Candidates

Nominee
Shannon Teresi, McHenry County auditor

Removed from ballot
Michael Kinney, pro-Trump activist

Results

Third parties and independents

Candidates

Nominee
 Deirdre McCloskey (Libertarian), professor at University of Illinois Chicago

General election

Polling

Results

Treasurer

The incumbent Treasurer is second-term Democrat Mike Frerichs.

Democratic primary

Candidates

Nominee
Mike Frerichs, incumbent treasurer

Endorsements

Results

Republican primary

Candidates

Nominee
Tom Demmer, state representative for Illinois' 90th district (2013—present)

Removed from ballot
Patrice McDermand

Results

Third parties and independents

Candidates

Nominee
 Preston Nelson (Libertarian)

General election

Endorsements

Polling

Results

State Senate

All of the seats of the Illinois Senate will be up for election in 2022, as this will be the first election following a redistricting.

State House of Representatives

All of the seats in the Illinois House of Representatives will be up for election in 2022.

Ballot measure
The Illinois General Assembly has the authority to refer statewide ballot measures, either as legislatively referred constitutional amendments or referendums. In order to be referred to voters, a proposed constutional amendment must receive a vote of 60% approval in both chambers of the Illinois General Assembly. No gubernatorial approval is required. Advisory questions require a simple majority approval vote in each chamber of the Illinois General Assembly and the signature of the governor.

In Illinois, ballot initiatives can be included on the ballot. In Illinois, in order to be included on the ballot, an initiative must receive signatures of support equal in number to 8% of the turnout for the previous gubernatorial election. For the 2022 election, this meant that ballot initiatives required 363,813 signatures. Ballot initiatives in Illinois are only permitted to revise Section IV of the Constitution of Illinois. In order for an initiative  be included on the November 2022 ballot, the signatures supporting it were required to be filed no later than May 8, 2022. No ballot initiative was filed by this deadline.

Thus far, a single ballot measure (a legislatively referred constitutional amendment) has been scheduled for the November general election.

Right to Collective Bargaining Amendment

In the November 8, 2022 general election, Illinois voters voted on whether to ratify the proposed Right to Collective Bargaining Amendment.

The proposed amendment would guarantee the right for employees to organize and bargain collectively through representatives of their choosing in negotiations concerning "wages, hours, and working conditions and to protect their economic welfare and safety at work." The amendment would also prohibit legislation which interferes with, negates, or diminishes collective bargaining agreements, including agreements which require union membership as a condition of employment. The amendment would, effectively, render any state or local "right-to-work" legislation (which would prohibit collective bargaining agreements that require union membership as a condition of employment) unconstitutional in Illinois.

Prohibition on local-level right-to-work ordinances currently exists through both Illinois state law and federal legal precedence. In 2019, Illinois ratified a state law prohibiting local governments from creating right-to-work zones. In 2017, in a case concerning a 2015 local right-to-work ordinance adopted by the village of Lincolnshire, Illinois, Judge Matthew Kennelly issued a ruling the in the United States District Court for the Northern District of Illinois that the National Labor Relations Act does not enable local governments to pass right-to-work laws. This was a ruling counter to a 2016 United States Court of Appeals for the Sixth Circuit decision on such laws. Kennelly's ruling was subsequently upheld the following year by the United States Court of Appeals for the Seventh Circuit in an unanimous decision.

Currently, only three states in the United States (Hawaii, Missouri, and New York) have clauses in their state constitutions which assert a right to collectively bargain. Currently, no state constitutions have a clause prohibiting right-to-work legislation (which ban collective bargaining agreements that require union membership as a condition of employment).

The legislation referring the proposed amendment to voters received the needed 60% approval vote in the Illinois Senate on May 21, 2021, and in the Illinois House of Representatives on May 26, 2021.

In order to be ratified, the amendment is required to receive either 60% support among those specifically voting on the amendment or 50% support among all ballots cast in the state's election.

If ratified, the amendment would expand the Bill of Rights contained in the Illinois Constitution of 1970. It would add the following text as a new 25th section of Article I of the Constitution of Illinois,

Judicial elections

Judicial elections will be held, consisting of both partisan and retention elections.

Local elections
Local elections will take place, including county elections such as the Cook County elections.

Notes

References

 
Illinois